"Get Out My Head" is a song by English producer Redlight featuring uncredited vocals from 2009 The X Factor contestant Nicole Jackson. The track was released as a digital download in the United Kingdom on 20 January 2012 and debuted at number eighteen on the UK Singles Chart, marking the producer's first appearance on that chart.

Music video
A music video to accompany the release of "Get Out My Head" was first released onto YouTube on 16 December 2011 at a total length of two minutes and fifty-one seconds.

Chart performance
For the week ending 4 February 2012, "Get Out My Head" debuted at number eighteen on the UK Singles Chart as the fourth highest new entry, with first week sales of 20,746 copies. The song spent three weeks inside the top 40, falling from number twenty-three to number forty-three on the week ending 25 February 2012. "Get Out My Head" also debuted at number four on the UK Dance Chart and number twenty-four on the Scottish Singles Chart for the week ending 4 February 2012, marking the producer's first chart appearance in Scotland and second appearance on the dance chart after "What You Talking About!?" peaked at number thirty-eight the previous year.

Track listing

Charts

Weekly charts

Year-end charts

Certifications

Release history

References

External links
 Redlight on Facebook
 Redlight on Twitter

Redlight (musician) songs
2012 singles
MTA Records singles
2012 songs
Songs written by Jonny Coffer